Martuthunira is an extinct Australian Aboriginal language, that was the traditional language of the Martuthunira people of Western Australia.

The last fluent speaker of Martuthunira, Algy Paterson, died on 6 August 1995. From 1980 he worked with the linguist Alan Dench to preserve Martuthunira in writing, and it is from their work that most of our knowledge of Martuthunira today comes.

Name
The name Martuthunira, pronounced  by native speakers, means "those who live around the Fortescue River". It has many spelling variants, including: Maratunia, Mardadhunira, Mardathon, Mardathoni, Mardathoonera, Mardatuna, Mardatunera, Mardudhoonera, Mardudhunera, Mardudhunira, Mardudjungara, Marduduna, Mardudunera, Marduthunira, Mardutunera, Mardutunira, Marduyunira, Martuthinya, and Martuyhunira.

Classification
Martuthunira is classified as a member of the Ngayarta branch of the Pama–Nyungan languages. Under Carl Georg von Brandenstein's 1967 classification, Martuthunira was classed as a Coastal Ngayarda language, but the separation of the Ngayarda languages into Coastal and Inland groups is no longer considered valid.

Phonology
Martuthunira has a fairly standard Australian phonology. R. M. W. Dixon uses it as a prototypical example in his 2002 book Australian Languages: Their nature and development.

Consonants

The laterals—but perhaps uniquely not the nasals—are allophonically prestopped.

The laminal stop  has a voiced allophone  between vowels.

In some words one particular realization is always used, in others there is free variation.

The alveolar stop  has a voiced allophone  after a nasal. It occurs between vowels only in a handful of words, probably all loanwords, where it has a longer period of closure than the other stops .

The retroflex stop  has a voiced allophone  after a nasal, and a flapped allophone  between vowels.

Besides the voiced allophones mentioned above, stops are usually voiceless and unaspirated.

The laterals have prestopped allophones  when they occur in a syllable coda.

The alveolar rhotic  is a tap  between vowels, and a usually voiceless trill  finally.

The palatal semivowel  may be dropped initially before , but the equivalent dropping of  before initial  is rare.

Vowels

 is usually , but is lowered to  when preceded by a dental consonant.

 is usually  when stressed,  when unstressed. Following a laminal consonant, more so after dentals than palatals, it is fronted towards .

 is usually simply .

Phonotactics
All Martuthunira words begin with one of the following consonants, from most to least frequent: . This consists of only peripheral and laminal stops, nasals, and semivowels.

Grammar

Accusative alignment

Unlike most Australian languages, which exhibit ergativity, Martuthunira and the other Ngayarta languages have an accusative alignment. That is, the subjects of transitive verbs are treated the same as the subjects of intransitive verbs, while the objects are treated differently.

The Martuthunira nominative case is unmarked (zero). The accusative case, which descends from a suffix that originally marked the dative case, takes the form  on proper nominals;  on common nominals ending in a nasal;  on common nominals ending in a lateral or a rhotic; and vowel lengthening for common nominals ending in vowels.

Case stacking
Martuthunira exhibits case stacking, where nouns take multiple case suffixes for agreement. For example:

Tharnta is the object of the verb, and so is in the accusative case.
Mirtily gets a proprietive suffix, which indicates that it is possessed by the euro. However, because it modifies , it additionally gets an accusative suffix to agree with it.
Thara gets a locative suffix, which indicates that it is what the joey is in.

References

External links
Handbook of Western Australian Languages South of the Kimberley Region — Martuthunira

Ngayarda languages
Extinct languages of Western Australia
Languages extinct in the 1990s